Martina Liptáková (born 27 September 1965) is a Czech basketball player. She competed in the women's tournament at the 1992 Summer Olympics.

References

External links
 

1965 births
Living people
Czech women's basketball players
Olympic basketball players of Czechoslovakia
Basketball players at the 1992 Summer Olympics
People from Slaný
Sportspeople from the Central Bohemian Region